In a Monastery Garden is a 1932 British drama film directed by Maurice Elvey and starring John Stuart, Hugh Williams, Alan Napier, and Frank Pettingell. An Italian musician begins to steal his brother's compositions after he is jailed for shooting a prince.

It was made at Twickenham Studios.

Cast
 John Stuart as Michael Ferrier  
 Hugh Williams as Paul Ferrier  
 Alan Napier as Count Romano 
 Dino Galvani as Cesare Bonelli  
 Frank Pettingell as Bertholdi  
 Humberston Wright as Abbot  
 Gina Malo as Nina  
 Joan Maude as Roma Romano  
 Marie Rambert Dancers as Les Sylphides
 Antony Tudor choreographer

Critical reception
The New York Times concluded "dullish is the word."

References

Bibliography
 Low, Rachael. Filmmaking in 1930s Britain. George Allen & Unwin, 1985.
 Wood, Linda. British Films, 1927-1939. British Film Institute, 1986.

External links
In a Monastery Garden at IMDB
BFI Database

1932 films
1932 drama films
Films directed by Maurice Elvey
British drama films
Films shot at Twickenham Film Studios
1930s English-language films
British black-and-white films
1930s British films